The Agricultural Experiment Station Barn is a historic barn at 614 Egan Way in Kodiak, Alaska.  Built in 1922, it is the last remaining structure of an agricultural experiment station established by the United States in 1907 and operated until 1931, determining that the local climate was viable for raising dairy cattle.  It is built in the style of a Wisconsin dairy barn, with post and beam framing, vertical siding, and a concrete foundation.

The barn was listed on the National Register of Historic Places in 2004.  At that time it was used by a variety of local government agencies as office space and storage.

See also
National Register of Historic Places listings in Kodiak Island Borough, Alaska

References

1922 establishments in Alaska
Barns on the National Register of Historic Places in Alaska
Government buildings completed in 1922
Buildings and structures on the National Register of Historic Places in Kodiak Island Borough, Alaska
Government buildings on the National Register of Historic Places in Alaska